HMS C14 was one of 38 C-class submarines built for the Royal Navy in the first decade of the 20th century. The boat survived the First World War and was sold for scrap in 1920.

Design and description
The C class was essentially a repeat of the preceding B class, albeit with better performance underwater. They displaced  on the surface and  submerged. The C-class submarines had a crew of two officers and fourteen ratings.

For surface running, the boats were powered by a single 16-cylinder  Vickers petrol engine that drove one propeller shaft. When submerged the propeller was driven by a  electric motor. They could reach  on the surface and  underwater.

The boats were armed with two 18-inch (45 cm) torpedo tubes in the bow. They could carry a pair of reload torpedoes, but generally did not as they would have to remove an equal weight of fuel in compensation.

Construction and career
C14 was built by Vickers at their Barrow-in-Furness shipyard, laid down on 4 December 1906 and was commissioned on 13 March 1908. The boat was sunk in a collision with Hopper No.27 at Plymouth Sound on 10 December 1913. There were no casualties. She was salvaged and recommissioned. C14 was finally sold on 5 December 1921.

Notes

References

External links 
 MaritimeQuest HMS C14 pages
 'Submarine losses 1904 to present day' - Royal Navy Submarine Museum

 

Ships built in Barrow-in-Furness
British C-class submarines
Royal Navy ship names
British submarine accidents
1907 ships
Shipwrecks of England
Maritime incidents in 1913